Vukić is a Serbo-Croatian surname, a patronymic derived from given name Vuk. It is itself a diminutive, meaning "little Vuk". It may refer to:

Adela Ber Vukić (1888–1966), Yugoslav painter
Aleksandar Vukic (born 1996), Australian tennis player
Darko Vukić (born 1968), Croatian football player
Ljubo Vukić (born 1982), Croatian handball player
Milan Vukić (born 1942), Bosnian chess Grandmaster
Zvonimir Vukić (born 1979), Serbian footballer

See also
Vuković
Vučić
Vujić

Serbian surnames
Croatian surnames
Patronymic surnames
Surnames from given names